The Taming of the Shrew (Italian: La bisbetica domata) is a 1942 Italian comedy film directed by Ferdinando Maria Poggioli and starring Amedeo Nazzari, Lilia Silvi and Lauro Gazzolo. It is based on William Shakespeare's play The Taming of the Shrew, with the setting updated to modern-day Rome.

It was shot at the Cinecittà Studios in Rome. The film's sets were designed by the art director Gastone Medin and Mario Rappini.

Cast

References

Bibliography 
 Gundle, Stephen. Mussolini's Dream Factory: Film Stardom in Fascist Italy. Berghahn Books, 2013.

External links 
 

1942 films
Italian comedy films
1942 comedy films
1940s Italian-language films
Films directed by Ferdinando Maria Poggioli
Italian black-and-white films
Films based on The Taming of the Shrew
Films shot at Cinecittà Studios
Films set in Rome
Minerva Film films
1940s Italian films